St. Mark's Episcopal Church is a parish of the Episcopal Church in Hope, Arkansas, in the Diocese of Arkansas. The congregation was founded in the late 1870s, and celebrated its first service on April 2, 1879. It was established as a parish on September 7, 1880.

It is noted for its historic parish church at 3rd and Elm Streets. The simple wood-frame Gothic Revival church was built in 1904–5, though it was not until March 28, 1909, when it was consecrated, by Bishop William Montgomery Brown. It has a modified T shape, with a gabled vestibule area on the north facade. Its stained glass windows are believed to have been designed by Louis Comfort Tiffany. The pipe organ was installed in 1915. The church was listed on the National Register of Historic Places in 1976.

See also
National Register of Historic Places listings in Hempstead County, Arkansas

References

Episcopal church buildings in Arkansas
Churches on the National Register of Historic Places in Arkansas
Churches completed in 1905
Churches in Hempstead County, Arkansas
National Register of Historic Places in Hempstead County, Arkansas
1879 establishments in Arkansas